Maud of Gloucester, Countess of Chester (died 29 July 1189), also known as Matilda, was an Anglo-Norman noblewoman and the daughter of Robert, 1st Earl of Gloucester, an illegitimate son of King Henry I of England, and Mabel, daughter and heiress of Robert Fitzhamon. Her husband was Ranulf de Gernon, 4th Earl of Chester (died 16 December 1153).

Family
Lady Maud was born on an unknown date, the daughter of Robert, 1st Earl of Gloucester and Mabel FitzRobert of Gloucester. She had seven siblings, including William Fitz Robert, 2nd Earl of Gloucester and Roger, Bishop of Worcester. She also had an illegitimate half-brother, Richard, Bishop of Bayeux, whom her father sired with Isabel de Douvres.

Her paternal grandparents were King Henry I of England and one of his mistresses, possibly Sybil Corbet or a daughter of Rainald Gay. Her maternal grandparents were Robert Fitzhamon, Lord of Gloucester and Glamorgan; and Sybil de Montgomery, daughter of Roger de Montgomery, 1st Earl of Shrewsbury and Mabel Talvas of Bellême.

Marriage and issue
Sometime before 1141, possibly as early as 1135, Matilda married Ranulf de Gernon, 4th Earl of Chester, and was accorded the title of Countess of Chester. Her husband had considerable autonomy in his palatine earldom.

In January 1141, Earl Ranulf and Countess Matilda were at Lincoln Castle when it was besieged by the forces of King Stephen of England. The following month, a relief army loyal to Empress Matilda and led by her father Robert earl of Gloucester defeated and captured the king in the fierce fighting, later known as the First Battle of Lincoln. In return for his help in repelling the king's troops, the countess's father compelled her husband to swear fealty to Empress Matilda, who was Earl Robert's half-sister.

On 29 August 1146, Earl Ranulf was seized by King Stephen at court in Northampton. Stephen later granted him the castle and city of Lincoln sometime after 1151.

Children
 Hugh de Kevelioc, 5th Earl of Chester (1147 – 30 June 1181), married Bertrade de Montfort of Évreux, by whom he had five children, including Ranulf de Blondeville, 6th Earl of Chester; Matilda of Chester, Countess of Huntingdon; and Hawise of Chester, 1st Countess of Lincoln
 possibly Richard of Chester (died 1170/1175), buried in Coventry
 Beatrice of Chester, married Raoul de Malpas
 possibly Ranulf of Chester; fought in the siege of Lisbon; granted the lordship of Azambuja by Afonso I of Portugal
 Alice, married Richard FitzGilbert de Clare (1190–1136)

Ranulf had an illegitimate son, Robert FitzCount (died before 1166), by an unknown mistress. His date of birth was not recorded. Robert married Agnes fitz Neal; he was her second husband.

One account contains an unsubstantiated rumor that Countess Maud poisoned her husband with the assistance of William Peverel of Nottingham, but there is no evidence that she did so. Earl Ranulf confirmed her grant to one of her servants, probably on his deathbed. She served as her minor son's guardian for nine years.

She was an important patron of Repton Priory in Derbyshire. She also made grants to Belvoir Priory.

The Rotuli de Dominabus of 1185 records property Wadinton de feodo comitis Cestrie, held by Maud, Countess of Chester. Although she was said to be about 50 years of age in that document, she was probably closer to 60 in that year.

Maud died on 29 July 1189, although the Annals of Tewkesbury records her death in 1190.

Ancestry

References
Notes

General sources
 Charles Cawley, Medieval Lands, Earls of Chester 1120-1232 (Family of Ranulf "le Meschin")
 The Peerage: Maud fitz Robert
 Stirnet: Normans2 
 Stirnet: Normans1 

12th-century births
1190 deaths
English countesses
12th-century English women
12th-century English people
Anglo-Normans